The International Journal of Lexicography is a peer-reviewed academic journal in the field of lexicography published by Oxford University Press. It was established in 1988 and appears four times a year. Current editor in chief is Robert Lew (Adam Mickiewicz University in Poznań).

Aims and scope
The journal is concerned with all aspects of lexicography, but places a special emphasis on dictionaries of major European languages. Apart from research papers - also in related fields, e.g. computational linguistics - it publishes reviews of dictionaries and contributions on practical aspects of lexicographic work.

References

External links
Journal homepage

Lexicography journals
Oxford University Press academic journals
Quarterly journals
English-language journals
Publications established in 1988